Mount Wangwu is a mountain situated about  north west of Jiyuan City in China’s Henan province. Located in the Wangwushan-Yuntaishan National Park, Mount Wangwu is a famous Taoist site that includes the “Celestial Grotto of the Small Pristine Void”, one of the Ten Grotto-heavens of Taoism.

According to legend, the Yellow Emperor used an altar on top of the mountain to offer sacrifices to Heaven or Tian where he received the Book of Nine Elixirs, one of the earliest Chinese alchemical texts.

References

External links
Images of Mount Wangwu

Mountains of Henan